Johanna "Hanneke" Jagersma (born 1 November 1951) is a Dutch former politician. She was member of the Communist Party of the Netherlands from 1974 to 1989 and mayor of Beerta from 1982 to 1990. She now works for Humanitas, a Dutch care organisation.

Early life 
Johanna Jagersma was born on 1 November 1951 in Wymbritseradiel in the Netherlands. She studied at the mulo, the havo, and the social academy. She became a member of the Communist Party of the Netherlands (CPN) in 1974. She worked from 1975 until 1982 as coordinator for elderly care in the municipalities of Finsterwolde, Nieuweschans, and Beerta.

Politics 

Jagersma was a member of the States of Groningen from 1978 until 1982, where she was leader of the CPN.

On 1 April 1982, she became mayor of Beerta and was the first communist mayor in the Netherlands. In 1983, she was the first mayor in the Netherlands to receive maternity leave while she was in office. Jagersma did not join GroenLinks, where the Communist Party was merged into in 1989. On 1 January 1990, Beerta was merged into Reiderland due to municipal reorganisations, and Jagersma was not appointed mayor of the new municipality.

After politics 
Jagersma works as manager for Humanitas, a Dutch care organisation. It was reported in 2013 that she became member of the Socialist Party. She was a member until September 2017.

References

External links 
 

1951 births
Communist Party of the Netherlands politicians
Living people
Mayors in Groningen (province)
Women mayors of places in the Netherlands
People from Wymbritseradiel